Luís Andres Hernández Mendoza (born June 26, 1984) is a Venezuelan former professional  baseball shortstop. He played in Major League Baseball (MLB) for the Baltimore Orioles, Kansas City Royals, New York Mets and Texas Rangers.

Career

Atlanta Braves
Hernández was signed as a non-drafted free agent by the Atlanta Braves on September 16, 2000. He spent five seasons in the Braves' minor league organization, but only played 19 games for their AAA affiliate, the Richmond Braves, before moving to Baltimore.

Baltimore Orioles
Hernández was claimed off waivers by the Baltimore Orioles on October 12, 2006. He made his major league debut for the Orioles as a late-inning defensive replacement July 8, 2007 against the Texas Rangers. Hernández collected his first major league hit, a double, in his second career game on July 12, 2007 against the Chicago White Sox at Oriole Park at Camden Yards. Hernández got his hit, a line drive to center field, off of the first pitch he saw from White Sox relief pitcher Dewon Day in the bottom of the ninth inning. He also got his first major league RBI on the play, as Jay Gibbons came in to score.  His first major league home run was hit on September 27, 2007 against the Toronto Blue Jays.

Hernández was penciled in as the Orioles' starting shortstop for the 2008 season, but faced Spring Training competition from Brandon Fahey. Considered an "all-defense" player, Hernández and Fahey vied for the position vacated by Miguel Tejada, who was traded to the Houston Astros over the offseason. He became a free agent at the end of the season.

Kansas City Royals
In November 2008, Hernández signed a minor league deal with the Kansas City Royals. He added to the major league roster on May 3, 2009 after Tony Peña Jr.was placed on the disabled list. On July 6, 2009, he was designated for assignment to make room for the newly acquired Ryan Freel. Hernández was released on January 19, 2010.

New York Mets

On February 3, 2010, Hernández signed a minor league contract with the New York Mets. The Mets purchased Hernández's contract from the Buffalo Bisons on August 27, 2010. Hernández played in 17 games for the Mets in 2010, batting .250 with two home runs with 6 RBI. His season ended after hitting a foul ball off his right foot, breaking a bone in his foot on September 18, although he still managed to hit a home run on the next pitch. On October 17, 2011, he elected free agency.

Texas Rangers
On December 1, 2011, Hernández signed a minor league contract with the Texas Rangers. Hernández spent most of 2012 with the Triple-A Round Rock Express, hitting .262/.303/.376 with eight home runs and 70 RBI in 129 games as the team's shortstop. Hernández did play two games with the Rangers, going 0-for-1 in each, coming in as a defensive replacement.

Cleveland Indians
On November 7, 2012, Hernández signed a minor league deal with the Cleveland Indians.

Wichita Wingnuts
Hernandez signed with the Wichita Wingnuts of the American Association of Independent Professional Baseball and played with them in the 2015 season.

Bridgeport Bluefish
On March 29, 2016, Hernández signed with the Bridgeport Bluefish of the Atlantic League of Professional Baseball.

On November 1, 2017, Hernández was drafted by the New Britain Bees of the Bridgeport Bluefish dispersal draft. On February 20, 2018, Hernández signed with the Bees for the 2018 season.

Post-playing career
However, Hernández later announced his retirement prior to the season on April 21, 2018, in order to pursue a coaching opportunity in the Kansas City Royals organization.

See also
 List of Major League Baseball players from Venezuela

References

External links

1984 births
Living people
Arizona League Indians players
Baltimore Orioles players
Binghamton Mets players
Bowie Baysox players
Bridgeport Bluefish players
Buffalo Bisons (minor league) players
Caribes de Anzoátegui players
Columbus Clippers players
Gulf Coast Braves players
Kansas City Royals players
Major League Baseball players from Venezuela
Major League Baseball shortstops
Mississippi Braves players
Myrtle Beach Pelicans players
New York Mets players
Norfolk Tides players
Omaha Royals players
People from Lara (state)
Richmond Braves players
Rome Braves players
Round Rock Express players
Salt Lake Bees players
Texas Rangers players
Tiburones de La Guaira players
Tigres de Aragua players
Venezuelan expatriate baseball players in the United States
Wichita Wingnuts players